Newboro is a ghost town in Wheeler County, Nebraska, United States.

History
A post office was established at Newboro in 1896, and remained in operation until it was discontinued in 1935.

References

Geography of Wheeler County, Nebraska